Chaona is a town of Lingtai County, Pingliang, Gansu, China. The town was historically known as Dongchaona and Anding Chaona. It is the birthplace of Huangfu Mi. During the Western Wei ( 535 to 557) it was the seat of Anwu County and Chaona County, where it served as a resource distribution center and military base.

References 

Township-level divisions of Gansu
Pingliang